United Nations Security Council Resolution 589, adopted unanimously at a closed meeting on 10 October 1986, having considered the question of the recommendation for the appointment of the Secretary-General of the United Nations, the council recommended to the General Assembly the Mr. Javier Pérez de Cuéllar be appointed for a second five-year term from 1 January 1987, to 31 December 1991.

The resolution was adopted unanimously by the council.

See also
 List of United Nations Security Council Resolutions 501 to 600 (1982–1987)
 United Nations Security Council Resolution 494

References
Text of the Resolution at undocs.org

External links
 

 0589
 0589
October 1986 events